Kuwait Entertainment City (Arabic: مدينة الكويت الترفيهية) was an amusement park located in the western outskirts of Kuwait City, the capital of Kuwait. Some of the park's attractions, such as its large Bolliger & Mabillard inverted roller coaster and its  narrow gauge railway, are common features in large-scale amusement parks in the United States, but were very rare in amusement parks in the Middle East. On 6 June 2016, the park closed with the aim of being renovated. In October 2019, it was announced that the Kuwait Entertainment City property will be taken over by Amiri Diwan and transformed into New Entertainment City Kuwait featuring 13 sections, including an indoor theme park envisioned by Ubisoft Entertainment and an indoor snowpark. By October 2020, the old park was fully demolished.

The Amiri Diwan has plans to replace it with the New Entertainment City, currently under construction. The New Entertainment City will include Outdoor Theme Parks, Indoor Theme Parks, Indoor Snow Parks, Water Parks, Aquarium, Dolphinarium, Museum and Planetarium, High Street Rail, a retail mall, Luxury District, Icon Hotel, and Sports and international festival areas. The New Entertainment City is expected to be one of the biggest entertainment venues in Kuwait when the project is complete.

Sections
The Arab World
International World
The Future World
Provincial Garden

Roller coasters

Railway
The railway continues to operate, but now uses a train built by the UK-based company Severn Lamb. The locomotive is one of their 4-4-0 Lincoln models custom-built to fit on  gauge track (the Lincoln model is normally built for  gauge track).

Iraqi military occupation
Kuwait Entertainment City was open every year since its inaugural season, except for the period during and after Iraq's invasion and occupation of Kuwait beginning in 1990.  From 1990 to 1991, Iraqi Forces took many of the park's rides and shipped them back to Iraq, while also pillaging and vandalizing the park's property.  Many of the stolen rides, including the park's Crown Metal Products locomotive and train cars, ended up in Al Zawra’a Dream Park, located in Downtown Baghdad.  After Iraqi forces were driven out of Kuwait and decisively defeated during Operation Desert Storm in 1991, the park began the process of recovery. It reopened to the public in 1994 until it closed for renovations on 6 June 2016.

Legacy and new park
While originally closed temporarily for renovations in 2016, the park was completely demolished in 2020, paving the way for a completely new park to be rebuilt on the same property, called "The New Entertainment City".

The Amiri Diwan's New Entertainment City is currently under construction in Kuwait.

References

External links
Kuwait Entertainment City - official website

1984 establishments in Kuwait
3 ft gauge railways in Kuwait
Amusement parks closed in 2016
Defunct amusement parks
Buildings and structures demolished in 2020
Demolished buildings and structures in Kuwait
Tourism in Kuwait